Abner, the Invisible Dog is a 2013 American comedy film directed by Fred Olen Ray and written by Pat Moran. It stars Daniel Zykov, Molly Morgen Lamont, David DeLuise, and David Chokachi.

Premise 
As Chad is celebrating his thirteenth birthday, his dog Abner starts talking and becoming invisible.

Cast

References

External links 

American comedy films
2013 films
2013 comedy films
Films directed by Fred Olen Ray
2010s English-language films
2010s American films